Barton is a civil parish in the City of Preston, Lancashire, England.  It contains ten listed buildings that are recorded in the National Heritage List for England.  Of these, one is at Grade II*, the middle grade, and the others are at Grade II, the lowest grade.  The parish contains the village of Barton and surrounding countryside.  Running through it is the Lancaster Canal, and a bridge crossing it and an aqueduct are listed.  The other listed buildings include farm buildings, milestones, a church, and a cross.

Key

Buildings

References

Citations

Sources

Lists of listed buildings in Lancashire
Buildings and structures in the City of Preston